The 1948 Liège–Bastogne–Liège was the 34th edition of the Liège–Bastogne–Liège cycle race and was held on 2 May 1948. The race started and finished in Liège. The race was won by Maurice Mollin.

General classification

References

1948
1948 in Belgian sport